CITYCOT College (City College of Technology and Training Center) is a non-profit college serving in Bosaso, Puntland state of Somalia.

History
City College of Technology (CITYCOT) was established in 2012 as an affiliate college to  university of Bosaso by Eng. Abdulhakim Husein Osman, the first Dean of computer science of the University of Bosaso and Jun 2016, the college becomes affiliated to University of Bosaso.

CITYCOT is a leading career college in Somalia,  offering diploma programs and certificate courses in Business, Information Technology, Telecommunication and Health Science.

Services
Career guidance and counseling
Student support services
Full-time, part-time and weekend courses

CITYCOT College is a Cisco Networking Academy, Microsoft IT Academy, and certified training partner with CompTIA.

Universities and colleges in Somalia
Organisations based in Puntland